Opakhan is a rural locality (a selo) in Bryansky District, Bryansk Oblast, Russia. The population was 73 as of 2013. There are 3 streets.

Geography 
Opakhan is located 5 km southwest of Glinishchevo (the district's administrative centre) by road. Sevryukovo is the nearest rural locality.

References 

Rural localities in Bryansky District